, collection of Internet Connection Records is being secretly trialled by two major British ISPs as part of a technical trial for mass surveillance under the Investigatory Powers Act 2016. The Home Office and National Crime Agency are also participating in the trial.

"Internet Connection Records" is a generic term for metadata records of UK Internet users' Internet access patterns. Data collected may include who they are, what sites they connected to and when, and what quantity of data was transferred, but does not include the data content of the transmissions. While the participants have been kept secret, the existence of the trial has been confirmed by the Investigatory Powers Commissioner’s Office.

References

See also 
 Mass surveillance in the United Kingdom
 NetFlow
 Pen register
 Traffic analysis

Government databases in the United Kingdom
Internet in the United Kingdom
Mass surveillance in the United Kingdom
Surveillance databases
Metadata